Johannes Aavik  ( in Randvere, Saaremaa, Estonia (then Russian Empire) – 18 March 1973 in Stockholm, Sweden) was an Estonian philologist and Fennophile who played an influential role in the modernization and development of the Estonian language.

Education and career
Aavik studied history at the University of Tartu and the University of Nezin in 1905. He was a member of the Young Estonia movement and obtained a Doctorate in Romance languages at the University of Helsinki in 1910. Aavik taught Estonian and French at Tartu University between 1926 and 1933. In 1934 he was appointed by the Estonian Ministry of Education as Chief Inspector of Secondary Schools, a position he held until 1940. He fled Soviet occupation in 1944 and lived in Stockholm for the remainder of his life.

Estonian language development
Johannes Aavik found that Estonian, which had for centuries been the language of peasants, needed innovation, as its sphere of usage widened rapidly with the emergence of a modern nation. There was a need for standardization of grammar and orthography as well as new technical terminology. Aavik added that the language also needed to be versatile and euphonic. In 1912 he started writing articles to literary journals, making proposing ways to develop the Estonian language. He suggested intensive borrowing from Finnish; many of his suggestions were quickly widely accepted and have become part of standard Estonian vocabulary. From 1914 he started to artificially create new new word stems to replace awkward compound words. Thus, he proposed relv ("weapon") instead of sõjariist (literally, "war tool"), roim ("crime") instead of kuritöö ("evil deed") and veenma ("convince") instead of uskuma panema ("put into believing"). He generally tried to avoid the sounds t and s and preferred shorter words to longer ones. He also favoured o in successive syllables to u, as is common in the South Estonian dialects. Aavik considered many of his neologisms as created out of nothing (see ex nihilo lexical enrichment). However, according to Ghil'ad Zuckermann, many of Aavik's neologisms were influenced by foreign lexical items, for example words from Russian, German, French, Finnish, English and Swedish (Aavik had a broad classical education and knew Ancient Greek, Latin and French). For example, roim ("crime") might have been influenced by the English word crime; relv ("weapon") might have been influenced by the English word revolver; and taunima ("to condemn, disapprove") might have been influenced by the Finnish word tuomita ("to condemn, to judge").

Aavik tried to modernize even the grammar. He advocated the usage of i-plural instead of t(d)-plural (keelis pro keeltes) and the i-superlative instead of the ordinary superlative (suurim pro kõige suurem), as well as –nd instead of –nud in active past participle. He proposed inflectional affixes to the ma-infinitive, but only some of them entered into popular usage. He also tried to introduce a future form of verbs and a female personal pronoun, but these got little positive response.

Aavik published numerous essays and translations to propagate his ideas; he had vocal supporters as well as opponents. In 1919, he published a dictionary of 2000 novelty words. His principles (utility, aesthetics and native quality) were summarized in Keeleuuenduse äärmised võimalused (Extreme Perspectives of Language Innovation; Tartu, 1924).

Language innovation slowly died away after the 1927 act that made it compulsory for schools to teach standard Estonian as put down in the Estonian Orthographic Dictionary (1925, chief editor J. V. Veski) and Estonian Grammar (by Elmar Muuk, 1927). However, some words proposed by Aavik and fallen into oblivion have been picked up and re-introduced by more recent literati.

An essay on linguistic innovation in Estonian by Paul Saagpakk can be found in his Estonian-English Dictionary.

Legacy 
On 26 September 1992 in Tallinn, Johannes Aavik Society was established. The society focuses on research of Estonian language and especially on those language aspects which are related to Johannes Aavik. The society has 107 members. The society publishes the publication "Keeleuuenduse Kirjastik".

References

Further reading 
 Antoine Chalvin. Johannes Aavik et la rénovation de la langue estonienne. Paris: ADEFO/L'Harmattan, 2010. 334 p.
 Virve Raag. The Effects of Planned Change on Estonian Morphology. Acta Universitatis Upsaliensis, Studia Uralica Upsaliensia, 29. Uppsala, 1998. 156 p.

External links
 Johannes Aavik at Estonian Writers' Online Dictionary

1880 births
1973 deaths
People from Saaremaa Parish
People from Kreis Ösel
Linguists from Estonia
Estonian male poets
Estonian World War II refugees
20th-century Estonian poets
Language reformers
20th-century male writers
Recipients of the Order of the White Star, 3rd Class
20th-century linguists